The Delevan National Wildlife Refuge is one of six refuges in the Sacramento National Wildlife Refuge Complex in the Sacramento Valley of central northern California.

Geography

An estimated 1,000 visitors observe wildlife from a primitive roadside overlook along the Maxwell-Colusa Highway each year. Approximately 7,000 people hunt on the refuge each year.

Natural history
More than 200,000 ducks and 100,000 geese come to the refuge each winter. With 95 percent of the wetlands of the Central Valley lost over the last 100 years, waterfowl have become increasingly dependent upon the refuges of the Sacramento Valley section.

The refuge supports several endangered plants and animals: giant garter snake, wintering peregrine falcon and bald eagle, breeding tricolored blackbird, and a large colony of the endangered palmate-bracted bird's beak (Cordylanthus palmatus) plant.

Resident wildlife include grebe, heron, blackbird, beaver, muskrat, black tailed deer and other species typical of upland and wetland habitats.

References

External links
FWS.gov: official Delevan National Wildlife Refuge website

National Wildlife Refuges in California
Wetlands of California
Protected areas of Colusa County, California
Landforms of Colusa County, California
Natural history of Colusa County, California